The 1957 Cleveland Browns season was the team's eighth season with the National Football League. They were 9–2–1 in the regular season and won the Eastern Conference title, but lost the championship game to the Detroit Lions, 59–14.

Season summary 
The Browns missed the playoffs the previous season, ending ten straight years of league championship game appearances. The Browns took care of business against the Giants, "bookending," as it were, their arch rivals. They beat New York 6–3 in the season opener and then edged them again 34–28 in the finale. The Browns also posted two shutouts on the year, 24–0 over the Pittsburgh Steelers and 31–0 over the Chicago Cardinals.

The Eastern foe the Browns had the most trouble with was fourth-place Washington (5–6–1). Cleveland edged the Redskins 21–17 and then had to settle for a 30–30 tie in the rematch. The Browns fell to Detroit 20–7, making them 0–3 against the Lions in the regular season since joining the NFL in 1950.

Although they had a rookie All-American running back out of Syracuse by the name of Jim Brown, the Browns were by no means an offensive juggernaut overall. The future Hall of Famer was outstanding, rushing for 942 yards and nine TDs, but he was the only real standout that year. Tommy O'Connell, who had taken over for retired Hall of Famer Otto Graham in 1956 and was the quarterback during the 5–7 finish that year, had the job for most of the way in 1957 as well. He and rookie Milt Plum combined for just 1,873 yards passing 12 touchdowns with 14 interceptions.

Schedule

Exhibition

Regular season 

Note: Intra-division opponents are in bold text.

Standings

Postseason

NFL Championship Game 

 Detroit Lions 59, Cleveland Browns 14

Scoring
 DET – FG Martin 31
 DET – Rote 1-yard run (Martin kick)
 DET – Gedman 1-yard run (Martin kick)
 CLE – Brown 29-yard run (Groza kick)
 DET – Junker 26-yard pass from Rote (Martin kick)
 DET – Barr 19-yard interception (Martin kick)
 CLE – Carpenter 5-yard run (Groza kick)
 DET – Doran 78-yard pass from Rote (Martin kick)
 DET – Junker 23-yard pass from Rote (Martin kick)
 DET – Middleton 32-yard pass from Rote (Martin kick)
 DET Cassady-yard pass from Reichow (Martin kick)

Awards and records 
 Jim Brown, NFL rushing leader, 942 yards
 Tommy O’Connell, NFL leader, passing yards, (1,229)

Milestones 
 Jim Brown, First Rushing Title

References

External links  
 1957 Cleveland Browns at Pro Football Reference (profootballreference.com)
 1957 Cleveland Browns Statistics at jt-sw.com
 1957 Cleveland Browns Schedule at jt-sw.com
 1957 Cleveland Browns at DatabaseFootball.com  
 1957 Season summary and statistics at Cleveland Browns.com

Cleveland
Cleveland Browns seasons
Cleveland Browns